Tawna Sanchez (born 1961/62) is an American politician, currently serving as a member of the Oregon House of Representatives. She represents the 43rd district, which covers parts of north-central Portland.

Early life and education
Sanchez was born and raised in Portland, Oregon. Sanchez is Native American, of Shoshone, Bannock, and Ute descent. She is the second Native American to serve in the Oregon legislature, and the first to represent Portland.

Sanchez graduated with a bachelor's degree from Marylhurst University and with a master's degree from Portland State University.

Career 
She has worked with the Native American Youth and Family Center for much of her life.

Sanchez has served on the Oregon Child Welfare Advisory Commission and the Oregon Family Services Review Commission.

She won election to the House in 2016, narrowly defeating Roberta Phillip-Robbins in the Democratic primary and running unopposed in the general election.

Electoral history

2022

See also
Jackie Taylor

References

External links
 Campaign website
 Legislative website

1960s births
21st-century American politicians
21st-century American women politicians
Bannock people
Date of birth missing (living people)
Living people
Marylhurst University alumni
Democratic Party members of the Oregon House of Representatives
Native American state legislators
Native American women in politics
Politicians from Portland, Oregon
Portland State University alumni
Shoshone people
Ute people
Women state legislators in Oregon
Native American people from Oregon